John Sutton, 3rd Baron Dudley ( –1553), commonly known as Lord Quondam, was an English nobleman.

Early life
John Sutton was born in 1494, at Dudley Castle, Worcestershire, the eldest son and heir of Sir Edward Sutton, 2nd Baron Dudley and his wife Cicely ( Willoughby) Sutton. His mother was a daughter of Sir William Willoughby and Joan Strangeways, and granddaughter of Katherine Neville, Duchess of Norfolk.

John Sutton had several younger brothers: Thomas, William, Arthur, Geoffery and George. Among his sisters were Hon. Eleanor Sutton (wife of Charles Somerset, 1st Earl of Worcester, and Leonard Grey, 1st Viscount Grane), Hon. Jane Sutton (wife of Sir Thomas Fiennes), Hon. Margaret Sutton (wife of John Grey, 2nd Baron Grey of Powis).

Career
John was knighted on 13 October 1513, and succeeded his father Edward Sutton, 2nd Baron Dudley as Baron Dudley in 1532. He immediately began to sell his patrimony, including half of Powis Castle. He was never summoned to Parliament.

John Sutton acquired the nickname "Lord Quondam" ('Lord Has-been' or 'Lord Formerly') when he allowed his estate, including the castle of Dudley, to fall into the possession of his cousin, John Dudley, Duke of Northumberland. Northumberland resided at Dudley Castle and added new and magnificent structures to the old fortress.

Dugdale wrote: "It is reported by credible tradition of this John Lord Dudley, that being a man of weak understanding, whereby he had exposed himself to some wants, and so became entangled in the usurer’s bonds, John Dudley, then Viscount Lisle and Earl of Warwick (afterwards Duke of Northumberland), thirsting after Dudley Castle, the chief seat of the family, made those money merchants his instruments to work him out of it, which by some mortgage being at length effected, this poor lord became exposed to the charity of his friends for a subsistence, and spending the remainder of his life in visits amongst them, was commonly called the Lord Quondam." There is much evidence in the Letters and Papers of the Reign of Henry VIII to suggest that Warwick and Cromwell between them colluded to entangle Lord Dudley before the fact, and did not simply take advantage of him afterwards, as suggested by Dugdale's sources. Cromwell had long been friends with Cecily Grey and her family and bought out Baron Dudley's lands to help save her family from ruin.

Personal life
By 30 October 1501, he was betrothed to Lady Cecily Grey, a daughter of Thomas Grey, 1st Marquess of Dorset, by Cecily Bonville, his wife, suo jure Baroness Harington and Baroness Bonville. They subsequently married and Lord Dudley and Lady Cecily were the parents of the following children:

 Edward Sutton, 4th Baron Dudley (–1586), who married Katherine Brydges, the daughter of John Brydges, 1st Baron Chandos, in 1556. After her death in 1566, he married Lady Jane Stanley, a daughter of Edward Stanley, 3rd Earl of Derby, in 1567. After her death, he married Mary Howard, the daughter of William Howard, 1st Baron Howard in 1571.
 Hon. Sir Henry Sutton Dudley (1517–1568), a diplomat who was a conspirator of the Tudor period; he married Anne Ashton, daughter of Sir Christopher Ashton.
 Hon. George Sutton, a soldier at Calais.
 Hon. Maud Sutton, who married Ralph Josceline.
 Hon. Margaret Sutton, who married William Guibon.
 Hon. Thomas Sutton (1539–1574), who married and had issue.
 Hon. Dorothy Sutton.
 Hon. Elizabeth Sutton.
 Hon. Robert Sutton.

After losing Dudley Castle in 1537, John Sutton, who retained the title Lord Dudley, decided upon a city residence at Tothill Street in Westminster. He died in Middlesex and was buried on 18 September 1553 in St Margaret's, Westminster, London; his wife was buried there on 28 April 1554. It is a perhaps not insignificant detail to add that his cousin and nemesis John Dudley, Duke of Northumberland was executed on 22 August the same year, 1553.

After Northumberland's execution, Dudley Castle was forfeited to the crown, and in 1555 was restored by Queen Mary to Lord Dudley's eldest son, Edward Sutton, 4th Baron Dudley.

References

1494 births
1553 deaths
People from Dudley
16th-century English nobility
John
John
3
Burials at St Margaret's, Westminster